Ten ships of the Royal Navy have been named HMS Clyde after the River Clyde that runs through the city of Glasgow, Scotland. For His Majesty's Naval Base Clyde see HMNB Clyde. 

  was a 38-gun fifth rate launched in 1796 and sold in 1814.
  was a 4-gun tender purchased in 1805 and sold in 1826.
  was a 46-gun fifth rate launched in 1828. She became a drill ship for the Royal Naval Reserve in 1870, and was sold in 1904.
  was a wooden screw gunboat launched in 1859, used a survey vessel from 1872 and sold in 1875.
  was a paddle vessel launched in 1900 and wrecked in 1951.
  was a  launched in 1934 and sold in 1946.
She was renamed HMS Clyde between 1954 and 1961.
  was a modified  launched in 2006, and decommissioned in 2020 to be transferred to the Royal Bahrain Naval Force.

See also

References
 

Royal Navy ship names